Chirakhan is a village in Punasa tehsil, Khandwa district, Madhya Pradesh, India. As per the Population Census 2011, the total population of Chirakhan is 641.

References

Villages in Khandwa district